Huitiupán is a town and one of the 119 Municipalities of Chiapas, in southern Mexico.

As of 2010, the municipality had a total population of 22,536, up from 20,041 as of 2005. It covers an area of 149 km2.

As of 2010, the town of Huitiupán had a population of 2,857. Other than the town of Huitiupán, the municipality had 93 localities, the largest of which (with 2010 populations in parentheses) were: Zacatonal de Juárez (1,361), La Competencia (1,147), and José María Morelos y Pavón (1,143), classified as rural.

References

Municipalities of Chiapas